Manoba poecila is a moth in the  family Nolidae. It was described by Wileman and West in 1928. It is found in the Philippines.

References

Moths described in 1928
Nolinae